Roquebert is a French surname. Notable people with the surname include:

Dominique Roquebert (1744–1811), French Navy officer
Lucien Roquebert (1890–1970), French cyclist

French-language surnames